Tucayaca is a genus of spur-throat toothpick grasshoppers in the family Acrididae. There are about five described species in Tucayaca, found mainly in South America.

Species
These five species belong to the genus Tucayaca:
 Tucayaca aquatica Bruner, 1920
 Tucayaca biserrata Roberts, 1977
 Tucayaca coeruleipes Roberts, 1977
 Tucayaca gracilis (Giglio-Tos, 1897)
 Tucayaca parvula Roberts, 1977

References

Acrididae